Mount Eisenhower, formerly Mount Pleasant, is a mountain in the Presidential Range in the White Mountains of New Hampshire approximately  high.  Named after President Dwight D. Eisenhower, its summit offers a 360° view. It is inaccessible by road.

The Crawford Path, carrying the Appalachian Trail, crosses the mountain near its summit.

The mountain was known as Mount Pleasant until the New Hampshire Legislature voted in 1969 to name it after President Eisenhower, and the U.S. Board on Geographic Names agreed in 1970.

The shortest trail route to the summit of Eisenhower is from a parking lot on Mount Clinton Road, to its west-northwest, via primarily the Edmands Path. Several routes are available from points more or less southwest of it on Route 302; the most used of these (probably roughly equal in popularity to the Edmands route) is via the Crawford Path, starting from a parking lot on Mount Clinton Road, very near 302 and just north of the Highland Center in the Crawford Notch area.  Mount Monroe lies on the ridge northeast of Mt. Eisenhower, and Mount Pierce to the southwest. All three of these peaks are included on the peak-bagging list of four-thousand footers in New Hampshire.  Mount Franklin, an "unofficial" peak (not prominent enough to be included in the list), lies between Mount Eisenhower and Mount Monroe.

See also

Eisenhower Memorial Wayside Park

References

External links
summitpost.org:Mount Eisenhower climbing info
 PeakBagger.com: Mount Eisenhower
hikethewhites.com hiking information

Mountains of New Hampshire
Mountains of Coös County, New Hampshire
New England Four-thousand footers
Mountains on the Appalachian Trail